is a Japanese provider of mobile portal and e-commerce websites headquartered in Shibuya, Tokyo. It owns the Mobage platform, which is one of the most popular cell phone platforms in Japan. It also operates many other services, including a popular e-commerce website DeNA Shopping (formerly: Bidders).

History 
 1999
 March: DeNA, Limited founded in Setagaya Ward, Tokyo.
 August: Relocates to Shibuya Ward, Tokyo and incorporates to become DeNA Co.
 November: Launches the online auction service Bidders.
 2001
 February: Launches recycle and reuse information site Oikura.
 2004
 March: Partners with Index Corporation to launch a mobile auction site Mobaoku.
 2005
 February: Lists on the Mothers section of the Tokyo Stock Exchange.
 2006
 February: Establishes a subsidiary Mobakore, launches the mobile gaming site Mobage Town (now Mobage) and mobile shopping site AU Shopping Mall.
 May: Establishes a subsidiary, Paygent Co.
 July: Acquires Airlink Co. and Takimoto Co.
 2007
 February: Transfers to the First Section of the TSE.
 2008
 February: Relocates to Yoyogi in Shibuya Ward of Tokyo.
 April: Establishes Niigata Customer Support Center in Bandai, Niigata Prefecture.
 2009
 October: Oikura transferred to Proto Corporation in an asset purchase.
 2010
 June: E★Everystar,  novel and comic posting community, launched in partnership with NTT DoCoMo.
 September: Shutters Mobage Town for PC, begins serving PC Mobage users with beta version of Yahoo! Mobage on Yahoo! JAPAN.
 October: Officially launches Yahoo! Mobage.
 October: Acquires U.S. game developer ngmoco.
 2011
 March: Consolidates Mobage Town and Plus+ (ngmoco's social gaming network) into a single global brand, Mobage.
 June: Japan Fair Trade Commission issues a cease-and-desist order against DeNA, finding that it violated article 19 the anti-monopoly act by pressuring or forcing game developers to release titles only for the Mobage platform.
 June: Founder and CEO Tomoko Namba stepped down to focus on her husband's recovery from an illness. Namba remained on the board as a director, with COO Isao Moriyasu being appointed President and CEO as well as general manager of social media, and the former CFO Makoto Haruta becoming the Director and Chairman.
 October: Reaches agreement with TBS Holdings to purchase the professional baseball team Yokohama BayStars.
 November: Formally announced intent to acquire a 66.92% stake in Yokohama BayStars Baseball Club, Inc., which operates Yokohama BayStars professional baseball team in Japan's Central League, for 6.5 billion Japanese yen from Tokyo Broadcasting System Holdings, INC. and BS-TBS, INC.
 November: Following the June 2011 cease-and-desist order, GREE and KDDI file suit against DeNA, claiming 1.5 billion yen in damages.
 December: 11 of the 12 professional baseball club owners approve DeNA's acquisition of the Yokohama BayStars, with Tohoku Rakuten Golden Eagles dissenting. Yokohama DeNA BayStars comes into existence the following day, after transfer of club shares from Tokyo Broadcasting System Holdings.
 2012
February 19: Developed JSX as a research project. The main developers are Kazuho Oku and Goro Fuji (a.k.a. gfx).
March: Announced a partnership with Disney to develop and promote mobile social games, including the tower defense mobile game Star Wars: Galactic Defense, released many months after Disney acquired Lucasfilm and the Star Wars intellectual property in October 2012.
 June: DeNA subsidy DeNA-China announced partnership with Chinese social network Renren to bring mobile games to Renren users using DeNA's Mobage social gaming platform.
 October 23: Released VoIP and messaging service Comm.
 November 7: DeNA and Cygames announce that they have entered a capital and business alliance, whereby DeNA would acquire a total of 500 shares or 20.03% of the company for 7.4 billion yen from Cygames majority owner CyberAgent and the Cygames board of directors. This was a follow up to a strategic alliance formed in the February of this year between the two companies.
 2013
 January 10: Announced social music service, "Groovy", along with a music partnership with SonyMusic, Universal Music Group, and several others.
 January 10: New logo revealed as well as the consolidation of the names of various services, including renaming Bidders as DeNA Shopping and Skygate as DeNA Travel.
 January 10: Introduced the new slogan, "Delight and Impact the World".
 November 25: Launch of Showroom app and browser, a Japanese live streaming service used primarily for Japanese idols and voice actors. It also has been integrated into the audition process for idol groups such as 22/7, Nogizaka46, and Keyakizaka46.
 December 4: Launch of the Manga Box app.
 2015
 January 20: Took ownership of MyAnimeList.
 March 17: A business alliance with Nintendo is formed.
 2016
 October: DeNA shuts down its U.S. subsidiary DeNA Global, Inc. due to the Western market share not meeting expectations, and shift focus towards its partnership with Nintendo. Japanese HQ DeNA Co., Ltd. will still oversee prior product releases in the Western market however.
 2019
 January: MEDIA DO HOLDINGS Co., Ltd. obtains all equity interests of MyAnimeList, LLC (head office: State of California, U.S., hereinafter "MAL") from DeNA Corp. (head office: State of California, U.S., hereinafter "DeNA"). MAL runs "MyAnimeList", one of the world's largest anime and manga database communities, and MEDIA DO HOLDINGS has signed an equity interest transfer agreement with DeNA through one of its subsidiaries, Media Do International, Inc. (head office: State of California, U.S.).
 2022
November: Nintendo and DeNA to establish a joint venture called Nintendo Systems, with Nintendo owning 80% of the shares and DeNA owning 20% of the shares. The company will be a Nintendo subsidiary and will focus on the research and development of Nintendo accounts, strengthening the business both companies have been working together since 2015.

Subsidiaries

Sports 
 Yokohama DeNA BayStars (2012 –) - Baseball team that competed in Central League of Nippon Professional Baseball 
 Kawasaki Brave Thunders (2018 –) - Basketball team that competed in Division 1 (B1) of B.League
 SC Sagamihara (2008 – )- Association Football team that competed in J3 League, a 3rd Division of Japanese Profesional Football League

Entertainments 
 SHOWROOM – a live streaming service used primarily for Japanese idols and voice actors.

Mobile games and products

2006–2011 
 Mobage – Mobile games platform
 Kaitō Royale

2012 
 Blood Brothers
 Rage of Bahamut
 Marvel: War of Heroes
 HellFire: The Summoning
 Defender of Texel

2013 
 Boney The Runner
 Transformers: Legends
 The Powerful: NYC
 NFL: Matchups
 G.I. Joe Battleground
 Monster Match
 Blood Battalion
 The Drowning
 Princess Slash And Dash
 Lawless
 The Gate (with Spicy Horse)
 Battle Quest: Rise of Heroes
 Final Fantasy Record Keeper

2014 
 Engines of War
 Isolani
 Godus
 Super Battle Tactics
 Star Wars: Galactic Defense
 Cheese Guardians
 Hell Marys
 Cupcake Carnival
 Qube Kingdom
 Pirate Bash
 The Collectables (with Crytek)
 Shadow Wars
 Money Run
 Totem Warriors
 Transformers: Age Of Extinction

2015 

 One Piece Setting Sail!
 Blood Brothers 2
 Crash UFO
 Transformers: Battle Tactics
 Military Masters
 Rob and Roll
 Marvel Mighty Heroes
 Legend Borne
 Go Go Ghost
 HellFire: The Summoning

2016 
 Miitomo (Service infrastructure, My Nintendo integration, and development cooperation with Nintendo EPD)
 Super Mario Run (Service infrastructure, My Nintendo integration and development cooperation with Nintendo EPD)

2017 
 Fire Emblem Heroes (Service infrastructure, My Nintendo integration, and development cooperation with Intelligent Systems)
 Uta Macross Sma-Pho De-Culture
 Animal Crossing: Pocket Camp (Service infrastructure, My Nintendo integration, and development cooperation with Nintendo EPD and NDcube)
 Megido 72
 PROGRAMMING ZEMI

2018 
 Arena of Valor (Service infrastructure, publishing cooperation with Tencent Games and TiMi Studios)
 Slam Dunk

2019 
 Pokémon Masters (Development cooperation with The Pokémon Company)
 Mario Kart Tour (Service infrastructure, My Nintendo integration, and development cooperation with Nintendo EPD)
 Attack on Titan: TACTICS

2021 
 Argonavis from BanG Dream! AAside
 Touhou Danmaku Kagura
 Dragon Quest The Adventure of Dai: A Hero's Bonds

References

External links
 

 
Japanese companies established in 1999
Companies listed on the Tokyo Stock Exchange
Entertainment companies of Japan
Internet properties established in 1999
Japanese brands
Nintendo
Software companies based in Tokyo
Video game companies established in 1999
Video game companies of Japan
Video game development companies
Video game publishers
Internet technology companies of Japan